Pierrefort (Auvergnat: Pèirafòrt) is a commune in the département of Cantal and Auvergne region in south-central France.

It is situated in the south of the département, approximately 100 km south of Clermont-Ferrand and 25 km south-west of Saint-Flour.

Population

Climate
Pierrefort has cold winters characterised by heavy snowfall whilst summer temperatures often reach 30 °C. Recently the period between May and August has been very dry.

Economy
 Agriculture and breeding (predominantly bovine)
 Craft industry; carpentry, house renovation, garden planning, design and maintenance.
 Service industries supporting summer and winter tourism.

Notable people
Jean Todt (born 1946), motor sport executive

See also
Communes of the Cantal department

References

Communes of Cantal
Auvergne
Cantal communes articles needing translation from French Wikipedia